Chalco is a census-designated place (CDP) in northern Sarpy County, Nebraska, United States, and an adjacent suburb of Omaha, with La Vista located to the southeast. The population was 10,994 at the 2010 census.

History
A post office was established at Chalco in 1888, and remained in operation until it was discontinued in 1950. The community was likely named after Chalco, in Mexico.

Geography
Chalco is located at  (41.183539, -96.133791).

Demographics

As of the census of 2000, there were 10,736 people, 3,719 households, and 2,915 families residing in the CDP. The population density was 3,703.3 people per square mile (1,429.4/km2). There were 3,758 housing units at an average density of 1,296.3/sq mi (500.3/km2). The racial makeup of the CDP was 95.24% White, 0.82% Black or African American, 0.30% Native American, 1.08% Asian, 0.02% Pacific Islander, 0.90% from other races, and 1.64% from two or more races. Hispanic or Latino of any race were 2.81% of the population.

There were 3,719 households, out of which 51.1% had children under the age of 18 living with them, 67.0% were married couples living together, 8.6% had a female householder with no husband present, and 21.6% were non-families. 16.0% of all households were made up of individuals, and 0.8% had someone living alone who was 65 years of age or older. The average household size was 2.89 and the average family size was 3.28.

In the CDP, the population was spread out, with 33.2% under the age of 18, 7.6% from 18 to 24, 43.6% from 25 to 44, 13.9% from 45 to 64, and 1.6% who were 65 years of age or older. The median age was 29 years. For every 100 females, there were 100.7 males. For every 100 females age 18 and over, there were 98.1 males.

The median income for a household in the CDP was $60,357, and the median income for a family was $62,217. Males had a median income of $40,403 versus $28,066 for females. The per capita income for the CDP was $21,370. About 2.0% of families and 2.9% of the population were below the poverty line, including 4.1% of those under age 18 and none of those age 65 or over.

Education
Most of Chalco is zoned to Millard Public Schools while a portion is zoned to Papillion-La Vista Community Schools.

References

Census-designated places in Sarpy County, Nebraska
Census-designated places in Nebraska